The Walter and Leonore Annenberg Award for Excellence in Diplomacy is an annual award given by the American Academy of Diplomacy in recognition of an individual or group who has made exemplary contributions to the field of American diplomacy. Recipients of the award are recommended by the Academy's Executive Committee and approved by the AAD Board of Directors.

References

American awards
Diplomatic awards and decorations